Blastobasis pentasticta is a moth of the  family Blastobasidae. It is found in Australia, including New South Wales.

It was first described in 1947 by Alfred Jefferis Turner, and the species epithet, pentastica, describes it as being "five- spotted". It was described from a specimen found in Sydney in the month of February.

References

External links
Australian Faunal Directory

Moths of Australia
Blastobasis
Moths described in 1947